The 2016 Memphis Open was a tennis tournament, played on indoor hard courts.  It was the 41st edition of the event known that year as the Memphis Open, and part of the ATP World Tour 250 series of the 2016 ATP World Tour. It took place at the Racquet Club of Memphis in Memphis, Tennessee, United States, from 8 through 14 February 2016. First-seeded Kei Nishikori won the singles title.

Points and prize money

Point distribution

Prize money

Singles main-draw entrants

Seeds

1 Rankings as of February 1, 2016

Other entrants 
The following players received wildcards into the main draw:
 Taylor Fritz
 Tommy Paul
 Frances Tiafoe

The following players received entry from the qualifying draw:
 Jared Donaldson
 Henri Laaksonen
 Michael Mmoh
 Yoshihito Nishioka

Withdrawals 
Before the tournament
  Kevin Anderson →replaced by  Austin Krajicek
  Tommy Haas →replaced by  Matthew Ebden
  Lu Yen-hsun →replaced by  Luca Vanni

Retirements 
  Matthew Ebden (left leg injury)

Doubles main-draw entrants

Seeds 

1 Rankings are as of February 1, 2016.

Other entrants 
The following pairs received wildcards into the main draw:
 Taylor Fritz /  Ryan Harrison
 David O'Hare /  Joe Salisbury

Finals

Singles 

  Kei Nishikori defeated  Taylor Fritz 6–4, 6–4

Doubles 

  Mariusz Fyrstenberg /  Santiago González defeated  Steve Johnson /  Sam Querrey 6–4, 6–4

References

External links 
 

Memphis Open
Memphis Open
Memphis Open
Memphis Open (tennis)